Jordan Christopher Baker (born December 23, 1981) is an American umpire for Major League Baseball. 

At 6' 7", Baker is the tallest active MLB umpire. Baker gained attention during the 2013 season for throwing wads of chewed gum onto the outfield grass after each half inning. Some critics described such action as disrespectful to the players and the ground crews.

Baker was the second base umpire on July 30, 2017, when Adrián Beltré of the Texas Rangers got his 3000th career hit against the Baltimore Orioles.

Baker made his first postseason assignment in 2017, appearing in the 2017 National League Wild Card Game.

Baker was the home plate umpire in the Texas Rangers' last game at Globe Life Park.

References 

Major League Baseball umpires
1981 births
Living people
Sportspeople from Enid, Oklahoma
Oklahoma State Cowboys baseball players